The 2012 Akron Zips men's soccer team represented the University of Akron during the 2012 NCAA Division I men's soccer season.

Competitions

Preseason

Regular season

Standings

Match results

MAC Tournament

NCAA Tournament

References 

Akron Zips men's soccer seasons
Akron Zips
Akron Zips